Class 43 may refer to

 British Rail Class 43 (HST), power cars for the InterCity 125 high speed train
 British Rail Class 43 (Warship Class), diesel-hydraulic locomotive 
 DRG Class 43, a German steam locomotive class
 South African Class 43-000